Jan Čulík (born 2 November 1952 in Prague) is a Czech academic and independent journalist. He is the founder and editor of the independent Czech Internet daily Britské listy since 1996.

Early career
Čulík is a graduate of Czech studies and English studies at the Faculty of Arts, Charles University in Prague (1977, PhDr 1978.) In the 1980s, he worked as a television producer in the United Kingdom, making films for Channel 4. He also worked with a number of Czech dissident organisations in the West, helping to disseminate information about pre-1989 oppression in Czechoslovakia. Beginning in 1989, Čulík worked as an investigative journalist for the Czech service of Radio Free Europe.

Recent activity
Čulík is Senior Lecturer in Czech Studies at the University of Glasgow, Scotland, and the author of several publications in this field, including the first detailed study of Czech émigré literature, Books behind the Fence: Czech Literature in Émigré Publishing Houses 1971-1989, and a series of collections of articles from Britské Listy: Jak Češi Myslí (How Czechs Think), Jak Češi Jednají (How Czechs Act), Jak Češi Bojují (How Czechs Fight)  and V Hlavních zprávách: Televize (On the Main News: Television). In November 2007, he published an extensive monograph about Czech cinema since the fall of Communism. In November 2012, he published a monograph dealing with the stereotypes disseminated by post-communist Czech feature film entitled A Society in Distress: The Image of the Czech Republic in Contemporary Czech Feature Film, and in September 2013 he published, in cooperation with six other international scholars, a monograph entitled National Mythologies in Central European TV Series: How J.R. won the Cold War.

Books
1985 - Orpheus Through the Ages: An Introduction to the History of the Orpheus Myth, Channel Four Television Limited, London, 
1991 - Knihy za ohradou: Česká literatura v exilových nakladatelstvích 1971-1989 (Books Behind the Fence: Czech Literature in Émigré Publishing Houses 1971-1989), Trizonia Publishers, Prague
November 2007 - Jací jsme: Česká společnost v hraném filmu devadesátých a nultých let (What we are like: Czech society in feature film of the 1990s and 2000s), Host, Brno, 
November 2012 - A Society in Distress: The Image of the Czech Republic in Contemporary Czech Feature Film, Sussex Academic Press,  
September 2013 - National Mythologies in Central European TV Series: How J.R. won the Cold War, Sussex Academic Press,

External links
 Britské Listy
 Čulík's 2002 study of the Czech media
 Another analysis of the Czech media
 Contributions on Czech affairs to Central Europe Review
 list of Jan Čulík's publications

References

Journalists from Prague
Czech literary critics
1952 births
Living people
Writers from Prague
Charles University alumni
Academics of the University of Glasgow